"Pressure" is the first single from Canadian rapper Belly's debut album, The Revolution. The song features established R&B artist Ginuwine, and it received heavy rotation on MuchMusic.

Music video
The video, which features a cameo appearance by Hulk Hogan and his daughter Brooke Hogan, takes place at a nightclub where Belly and Ginuwine are surrounded by women. The video was directed by RT!.

Chart positions

Awards and nominations
2007 MuchMusic Video Awards
MuchVibe Best Rap Video (Won)
Video of the Year (Nominated)
Best Director - RT! (Nominated)
Best Cinematography - Adam Marsden (Nominated)

References

2006 songs
2006 singles
Belly (rapper) songs
Ginuwine songs
CP Music Group singles
Songs written by Belly (rapper)
Songs written by Ginuwine